Hopewell is a community in Georgetown and Williamsburg counties in the U.S. state of South Carolina. It lies at an elevation of 49 feet (15 m).

References

Unincorporated communities in Georgetown County, South Carolina
Unincorporated communities in Williamsburg County, South Carolina
Unincorporated communities in South Carolina